Sudra (  Jewish Babylonian Aramaic square script:) is a rectangular piece of cloth sometimes worn as a scarf or headdress as part of ancient Jewish tradition. Over time it held many different functions and today is sometimes understood to be of great cultural or religious significance to Jews.

Etymology

The Babylonian Talmud presents what Jastrow calls a "playful etymology" of the term as a contraction of  a section of Psalm 25:14.

History
The exact historical origins of wearing a piece of cloth wrapped around one's head are, at the moment, unclear. Some of the earliest examples can be found in artworks from ancient Mesopotamia, like statues of statues of Gudea wearing a turban-like garment. Similar headdresses might have been worn back as early as 2600 BCE. These headdresses are often imbued with great historical, religious, and cultural significance in the Near East. According to the Irish Professor of Biblical Studies John Raymond Bartlett, the Ancient Hebrews also wore pieces of cloth, either fashioned like the kūfīyah, a folded up piece of fabric wound around one's head or like a turban or stocking cap.

The  was kept much like a pocket handkerchief but mainly used for wiping away sweat, as the name implies. It was a modern invention around the time of Cicero when fine-linen first came to Rome. In the east of the empire, the term was borrowed by Hellenistic writers as  replacing older terms. It can be found in texts dealing with events in Province of Judaea like the Gospel of Luke for example, where a servant stores money in a such a cloth. Besides being used to wipe away sweat it was also worn around the neck as a piece of clothing akin to a scarf. In the Latin-speaking empire the term  came to replace  during the Augustan age. This piece of cloth when waved in the air also came to be used to signify applause in Rome, replacing the lappet of the toga used previously for this purpose. Wilhelm Adolf Becker argues against the use of the  being used used to wipe one's nose. The  also came to be part of Roman military armor, commonly called focale in its function as a neckerchief to protect against chafing by the armor.

In the 5th century when the Peshitta was translated, one finds another meaning for "sudra" namely that of a burial cloth for example in John 11:44 . This meaning is reflected in the names of the relics of the Sudarium of Oviedo and the Sudarium of Veronica.

Katz, Houtman, and Sysling provide insight as to why a burial cloth, as well as a headdress would be called by the same name. Thereby elucidating the Palestinian-Aramaic use of the term sudra, as a broad term for textile sheets used for coving the bodies of human beings. Sokoloff corroborates this broader use stating the sudra to have been a "piece of cloth [...] employed to tie and cover a variety of items" apart from a garment.

Wajsberg identifies this mention of the sudra as a late addition to the text, being absent from earlier versions and as evidence of Palestinian-Aramaic linguistic influence on the Babylonian Talmud. Havlin also observes that some versions of Targum of Ruth 1:17 contain the term. In most versions of the section, in which Naomi lists 4 methods of execution employed by the Jews,  the fourth method is stated as 'cruxifixction'. MS De Rossi 31 however deviates from this claim, through what appears to be a scribal correction of what the corrector understood to be a halakhic error. It states Aramaic: וחניקת סודרה, lit. 'and suffocation [by means of] sudra' instead of Aramaic: וצליבת קיסא,  lit. 'and cruxifixction/hanging on [the] stake'. Havil's view of the sudra being a tool for torment an execution in halakhic tradition is based on numerous mentions of this use, such as Targum Pseudo-Jonathan's translation of Exodus 21:16 (Medieval Jewish Aramaic: יתקטיל בשינוקא דסודרא‏, romanized: ytqṭl bšnwqʾ dswdrʾ, lit. 'he should be killed by strangulation of the sudra') as well as a section from Avodah Zarah which states .

Style 
The Babylonian Talmud states fashions of wearing the garment, as well as who wore it. Several tractates thereof describe it as being wrapped around one's head. Berakhot 60b:5 additionally provides a prayer to be recited upon attiring the garment in this fashion .

Another fashion of wear mentioned in therein is wearing the sudra around one's neck, Jastrow suggests that it also had been worn over one's arms. The 10th century commentator Rashi states Medieval Jewish Aramaic: וסודר שבצוארו - ותלויין ראשיו לפניו לקנח בו פיו ועיניו, lit. 'And the Sudra is arranged on one's neck – and the ends thereof were used to wipe one's mouth or eyes' commenting on this passage.

Saul Lieberman suggests that the headdress worn by religious authorities called "a sudra" is unrelated to the Roman Sudarium. Rather being a Cidaris. For this he cites an early medieval Latin glossary which states . This Cidaris was a turban-like headdress worn by the Kings of Persia and as stated before also the rabbinical authorities.

According to Lier, Targumim suggest Moses wore a sudra on his head, specifically his radiant forehead. Concealing the nature of the Israelite god, except when revealing the Ten Commandments, when he is meant to have removed his sudra from his forehead according to Lier.

There is textual evidence for its use as footwear.

Decline
Amongst Mizrachi Jewry, the custom mostly remained despite instances of prohibitions imposed by various non-Jewish rulers. One example of such a prohibition is the 1667 ʿAṭarot decree (Judeo-Yemeni Arabic: , romanized: ʿAṭarot, lit. 'cloth turbans' from ) issued by the Qasimid State, which prohibited Jews from wearing anything resembling said ʿAṭarot, that is of wearing any sort of cloth to cover their heads. Goal of this decree was to humiliate Jews by depriving them of a respectable appearance by forcing them to use their clothes to cover their heads. The situation was remedied with the Jewish community in Yemen bribing government officials. The solution achieved through this act of corruption allowed Jews to wear cloths on their heads again, but they had to be shabby cloths.

See also 

 Sudarium – Roman garment conceptually related
 Priestly turban – Ancient Jewish headdress 
 Keffiyeh – Similar regional headdress 
 Shtreimel – Jewish fur headdress

Notes

References

Jewish religious clothing
Religious headgear
Scarves
Turbans
Historical footwear
Folk footwear
Execution equipment
Linens
Woven fabrics